Gisostola melancholica is a species of beetle in the family Cerambycidae. It was described by Thomson in 1857. It is known from Brazil.

References

Forsteriini
Beetles described in 1857